Norman Chester Harvey (May 19, 1899 – December 14, 1941) was an American football tackle who played five seasons in the National Football League with the Buffalo Bisons, Detroit Panthers, New York Yankees and Providence Steam Roller. He played college football at the University of Detroit Mercy and attended Calumet High School in Calumet, Michigan.

References

External links
Just Sports Stats

1899 births
1941 deaths
Players of American football from Michigan
American football tackles
Detroit Titans football players
Buffalo Bisons (NFL) players
Detroit Panthers players
New York Yankees (NFL) players
Providence Steam Roller players
People from Calumet, Michigan